Heneral Tuna is a 2021 Philippine animated web miniseries directed by Avid Liongoren under Rocketsheep Studio.

Premise
Heneral Tuna, an alien cat from the Planet Mingming is tasked to invade Earth and accidentally crashlands in Barangay Hiraya in the Philippines. Not wanting to waste time, he starts a reconnaissance mission to observe the locals as part of a preparation for an invasion. He learns about Filipino values and culture in the process.

Characters
Heneral Tuna
Voiced by: Manny Angeles
A devious blue cat-like alien cat who gets stranded in Barangay Hiraya in the Philippines.

Production
Heneral Tuna was produced by Rocketsheep Studio with Avid Liongoren as director and Carlo Vergara as its scriptwriter.

The National Commission for Culture and the Arts (NCCA) commissioned an animated series for its Filipino Values Program. Prior to Heneral Tuna'''s release, the cultural agency launched a study with the National Economic and Development Authority (NEDA) in 2019 to determined values held among Filipinos in the country. Among the top 20 values identified in the study which influenced Heneral Tuna's production were " family, faith, resilience, care for environment, honesty, love for country, valuing culture and arts, and good governance". Each of the first seven episode feature a value. There are plans to feature the rest of the 13 values but it would still depend on the reception to the initial release of the series. The values are presented in the "context of the pandemic". Heneral Tuna is the first involvement of the NCCA in animation, having commissioned the live action teleserye Project Destination.

The series revolves around an alien cat who lands in a barangay in the Philippines. Liongoren said that the production team has considered two alternate concepts for a Filipino values-oriented series: a young Jose Rizal who time travels to the future, a robot built by an old scientist who learns how to be human, and a high school of tikbalangs and manananggals who stops eating Filipinos after learning more about them. The adopted concept involving a cat protagonist was inspired from a YouTube video of a cat who thinks about how miserable it was in the company of humans. Liongoren contrasts cats to dogs, noting the common characterization of dog characters as "perpetually happy". He describes cats as more communicative who often indulge in "internal monologues".

According to Vergara, he wrote the cat protagonist with the mindset similar to a "child trying to explore the world" but maintains that the series could be enjoyed by an older audience. He also added that he tends to incorporate comedy in the stories he writes, including Heneral Tuna. The fictional setting of Barangay Hiraya is based on a real life community in Pila, Laguna.

The production of Heneral Tuna began in August 2020 and ended a year later.

ReleaseHeneral Tuna premiered online on October 15, 2021, on the Film Development Council of the Philippines's paid subscription service FDCP Channel as well as in Kumu. The series will have seven episodes with each having a run-time of about three minutes. An episode will be released every week on Fridays. The series was produced in Filipino language with English subtitles.

Episodes

See alsoHayop Ka!Saving Sally''

Notes

External links

References

Philippine animated television series
Television shows set in the Philippines
Animated television series about cats
Animated television series about extraterrestrial life
Television series about alien visitations
Alien invasions in television